Golf Hall of Fame may refer to:

 World Golf Hall of Fame, St. Augustine, Florida
 Canadian Golf Hall of Fame
 National Black Golf Hall of Fame
 Connecticut Golf Hall of Fame
 Wisconsin Golf Hall of Fame